Peter Harte is an Irish Gaelic footballer who plays for the Errigal Ciarán club and the Tyrone county team.

He has played for Ireland in the 2015 International Rules Series and won an All Star Awards in 2016 and 2021.

He is the nephew of the Louth and ex-Tyrone football manager Mickey Harte and is married to Áine Canavan, daughter of Peter Canavan and Tyrone Ladies' footballer.

References

1990 births
Living people
Errigal Ciarán Gaelic footballers
Peter
Tyrone inter-county Gaelic footballers